Catherine Nanziri (born 13 September 1999) is a Ugandan boxer. She competed in the women's flyweight event at the 2020 Summer Olympics.

References

External links

1999 births
Living people
Ugandan women boxers
Olympic boxers of Uganda
Boxers at the 2020 Summer Olympics
Sportspeople from Kampala